Discovery Bay is a census-designated place (CDP) in eastern Contra Costa County, California in the United States, about 60 miles (97 km) from San Francisco.  It is located in the San Francisco Bay Area. As of 2020, its population was 15,358, a 15% percent gain from 13,352 at the 2010 census.

Discovery Bay was originally a waterfront community built on a network of man-made dikes, surrounded by fresh water, except for the southeast quadrant, which comprises the golf course of Discovery Bay Country Club. Some homes have private docks with access to the Sacramento–San Joaquin River Delta. Newer developments have been added on former agricultural land to the west of the initial town-site. Road access is via California State Route 4.

History
Discovery Bay has a short history. It began as a planned community in 1964, and originally designated as "Riverside" and "River Lake." It was built on land known as the Byron Tract, which was previously used for growing barley and potatoes. In 1968, Jurgen Lunding led an effort to give the community its current name.

In July 2007, Discovery Bay received its own ZIP code: 94505.  Formerly, it had shared 94514 with Byron. The ensuing celebration included a paddle boat raft-up that set a world record.

Geography

Government
Discovery Bay is one of the unincorporated areas in California that has a community services district (CSD), a special district that provides some basic services that are usually provided by the county. The primary duties of the area's community services district, known as The Town of Discovery Bay Community Services District, are handling water, sewer, landscaping and recreation.  The CSD Board has five members who are elected by community residents. While the CSD Board has no land use or zoning authority, the CSD can advise the county on decisions related to police and fire services, residential and commercial development, and more.

In December 2016, the CSD Board announced that Discovery Bay resident Mike Davies would become the general manager of CSD, effective January 3, 2017. He would replace the interim manager, Catherine Kutsuris. Davies had served as a police officer in Brentwood, California, including five years as chief of police there. Retiring from Brentwood Police Department in 2006, he was hired at the California Police Officers Standards  and Training organization in Sacramento.

Demographics

2000
At the 2000 census there were 8,981 people, 3,349 households, and 2,635 families in the town.  The population density was 429.2/km (1,111.9/mi2).  There were 3,781 housing units at an average density of 180.7/km (468.1/mi2).  The racial makeup of the town was 87.57% White, 1.84% Black or African American, 0.84% Native American, 1.78% Asian, 0.18% Pacific Islander, 3.95% from other races, and 3.84% from two or more races.  10.43% of the population were Hispanic or Latino of any race.
Of the 3,349 households 33.7% had children under the age of 18 living with them, 71.3% were married couples living together, 4.3% had a female householder with no husband present, and 21.3% were non-families. 14.0% of households were one person and 2.9% were one person aged 65 or older.  The average household size was 2.64 and the average family size was 2.91.

The age distribution was 24.5% under the age of 18, 4.4% from 18 to 24, 33.0% from 25 to 44, 29.5% from 45 to 64, and 8.6% 65 or older.  The median age was 39 years. For every 100 females, there were 107.0 males.  For every 100 females age 18 and over, there were 106.6 males.

The median household income was $89,915 and the median family income  was $90,272. Males had a median income of $66,121 versus $41,850 for females. The per capita income for the CDP was $41,313.  About 1.9% of families and 3.3% of the population were below the poverty threshold, including 1.7% of those under age 18 and 4.3% of those age 65 or over.

2010
At the 2010 census Discovery Bay had a population of 13,352. The racial makeup of Discovery Bay was 10,909 (81.7%) White, 550 (4.1%) African American, 86 (0.6%) Native American, 522 (3.9%) Asian, 51 (0.4%) Pacific Islander, 468 (3.5%) from other races, and 766 (5.7%) from two or more races. Hispanic or Latino of any race were 2,074 persons (15.5%).

The census reported that 13,315 people (99.7% of the population) lived in households, 37 (0.3%) lived in non-institutionalized group quarters, and no one was institutionalized.

There were 4,702 households, 1,879 (40.0%) had children under the age of 18 living in them, 3,133 (66.6%) were opposite-sex married couples living together, 369 (7.8%) had a female householder with no husband present, 231 (4.9%) had a male householder with no wife present.  There were 297 (6.3%) unmarried opposite-sex partnerships, and 42 (0.9%) same-sex married couples or partnerships. 686 households (14.6%) were one person and 193 (4.1%) had someone living alone who was 65 or older. The average household size was 2.83.  There were 3,733 families (79.4% of households); the average family size was 3.12.

The age distribution was 3,588 people (26.9%) under the age of 18, 837 people (6.3%) aged 18 to 24, 3,571 people (26.7%) aged 25 to 44, 3,871 people (29.0%) aged 45 to 64, and 1,485 people (11.1%) who were 65 or older.  The median age was 39.6 years. For every 100 females, there were 101.0 males.  For every 100 females age 18 and over, there were 100.1 males.

There were 5,403 housing units at an average density of ,of which 4,702 were occupied, 3,873 (82.4%) by the owners and 829 (17.6%) by renters.  The homeowner vacancy rate was 3.4%; the rental vacancy rate was 6.3%.  10,578 people (79.2% of the population) lived in owner-occupied housing units and 2,737 people (20.5%) lived in rental housing units.

Education
Schools in Discovery Bay are part of the Byron Union School District. There are two K–5 schools in the district, and both were named California Distinguished Schools in 2012: Discovery Bay Elementary and Timber Point Elementary. Excelsior Middle School is located in Byron and is the district's sole 6–8 school.  Major renovations and new buildings were completed at Excelsior Middle School in 2012. It was a California Distinguished School in early 2004. High school students (9–12) attend Liberty High School in the Liberty Union High School District, located in nearby Brentwood. Liberty High School students have founded an arts group known as "PADA" and have arranged with city officials to allow select students to paint and personalize certain electrical boxes, walls, etc. in the theme of the town. Plans for a fifth high school on the south side of State Route 4 are on hold.

References

External links

Discovery Bay Information
Town of Discovery Bay
Reclamation District 800
Discovery Bay Chamber of Commerce
Discovery Bay Lions Club 
Discovery Bay Yacht Harbor
Discovery Bay Golf & Country Club

Census-designated places in California
Census-designated places in Contra Costa County, California
Populated places established in 1964
Sacramento–San Joaquin River Delta
1964 establishments in California